Deh-e Arab is a village in Faragheh Rural District, in the Central District of Abarkuh County, Yazd Province, Iran. At the 2006 census, its population was 925, in 271 families.

References 

Populated places in Abarkuh County